Life Itself may refer to:

Films
Life Itself (2014 film), a documentary, film adaptation of film critic Roger Ebert's memoir
Life Itself (2018 film), an English-language romance drama film

Songs
"Life Itself" (George Harrison song), a song by George Harrison from Somewhere in England
"Life Itself", a song by Glass Animals from How to Be a Human Being
"Life Itself", a song by Bruce Springsteen from Working on a Dream

Books
Life Itself: A Memoir, a 2011 memoir by film critic Roger Ebert
Life Itself: Its Origin and Nature, a 1981 book by Francis Crick
Life Itself: A Comprehensive Inquiry Into the Nature, Origin, and Fabrication of Life, a 1991 book by Robert Rosen

Other
Life Itself with Sanjay Gupta and Marc Hodosh, a premier health conference in partnership with CNN